Wibu may refer to:
 KQEG-CD or WBOO
 Japanophilia or Weaboo
 Wibu-Systems software